The Majdanpek mine is a large copper mine located in the east of Serbia in Bor District. Majdanpek represents one of the largest porphyry copper reserves in Serbia and in the world having estimated reserves of 619.5 million tonnes of ore grading 0.33% copper. The mine also has gold reserves amounting to 7.68 million oz and silver reserves of 56 million oz.

See also
 RTB Bor

References

Copper mines in Serbia
Open-pit mines